Arthur Vanoverberghe (born 7 February 1990) is a Belgian former racing cyclist. He rode at the 2013 UCI Road World Championships.

Major results
2007
 1st Stage 3a (TTT) Sint-Martinusprijs Kontich
2008
 National Junior Road Championships
1st  Road race
1st  Time trial
 1st Omloop Mandel-Leie-Schelde Juniors
2010
 2nd Grand Prix de Waregem
 3rd Overall Tour de Liège
2011
 3rd Time trial, National Under-23 Road Championships
2015
 5th De Kustpijl

References

External links

1990 births
Living people
Belgian male cyclists
People from Menen
Cyclists from West Flanders
21st-century Belgian people